Dharumavantha School (Dhivehi: ދަރުމަވަންތަ ސްކޫލް ) is a public and coeducational school in Malé, Maldives. The school was established in January 2002 with the split of the Majeedhiya School campus into two separate single gender schools, the newly formed school being Dharumavantha. With the establishment of a second male-gender secondary school, the staff and students of Majeedhiya School were split, with half transferred to the new school.

In 2010, the new government decided to introduce coeducation as well as primary grades in all of the four single gender secondary schools in the city. In 2011, Dharumavantha School welcomed the first co-educational batch of students admitted into the newly formed primary Grade 1 in the school. The change did not affect the current secondary school operations, which is to run as a single gender school until the new co-educational batch progresses to the secondary level.

References

External links
 

Schools in the Maldives
Malé
Educational institutions established in 2002
2002 establishments in the Maldives